Li Yunqiu (Chinese: 李运秋; Pinyin: Lǐ Yùnqiū; born 3 October 1990) is a Chinese football player who plays for Chinese Super League club Shanghai Shenhua as a right-back.

Club career
Born in Shanghai, Li joined Genbao Football Academy in July 2000 and was promoted to Shanghai East Asia squad in 2006 for the China League Two campaign. He made an impression in right-back position within the team as Shanghai East Asia won promotion to the second tier in the 2007 season. His position was swung between starting line-up and bench after 2010 season. Li appeared in 18 league matches in the 2012 season, as Shanghai East Asia won the champions and promoted to the top flight. On 12 May 2013, he scored his first senior goal in a league match which Shanghai East Asia lost to Hangzhou Greentown 2–1.

On 19 February 2014, Li transferred to fellow Chinese Super League and 2014 AFC Champions League qualified side Beijing Guoan. Li would have a difficult first season at Beijing Guoan after not being included in the AFC Champions League squad because of a late VISA application, as well picking up an injury during preseason, which meant he did not make his debut until 26 July 2014 in a league game against Changchun Yatai F.C. in a 2-2 draw that also saw Li receive a red card. Despite having paid 7 million Yuan for his services, Li would become the club's third choice right-back behind Zhang Chengdong and Zhou Ting and Beijing were willing to listen to offers to sell him. He moved to another Super League club Shanghai Greenland Shenhua on 25 February 2016. He extended his contract with the club for five years on 19 November 2017.

Career statistics 
Statistics accurate as of match played 3 January 2022.

Honours

Club
Shanghai East Asia
 China League One: 2012
 China League Two: 2007

Shanghai Shenhua
Chinese FA Cup: 2017, 2019

References

External links
 

1990 births
Living people
Chinese footballers
Footballers from Shanghai
Shanghai Port F.C. players
Beijing Guoan F.C. players
Shanghai Shenhua F.C. players
Association football defenders
Chinese Super League players
China League One players
China League Two players